Mystacoleucus argenteus is a species of cyprinid fish.

Distribution and habitat 
Salween River Basin; freshwater

References

External links 
http://www.fishbase.org/summary/24042

Fish of Thailand
Cyprinid fish of Asia
Fish described in 1888